Ivana Miloš Prokopić (born 7 March 1986 in Rijeka) is a Croatian volleyball player. She is a member of the Croatia women's national volleyball team and played for AGIL Novara in 2014. She was part of the Croatian national team at the 2014 FIVB Volleyball Women's World Championship in Italy.

Clubs
  ŽOK Rijeka (2001–2010)
  Igtisadchi Baku (2010–2011)
  Lokomotiv Baku (2011–2012)
  Volley 2002 Forlì (2012–2013)
  AGIL Novara (2013–2014)
  Bursa BB (2014–2015)
  Nilüfer Belediyespor (2015–2016)
  Bursa BB (2016-)

Awards
 2016–17 CEV Women's Challenge Cup -  Champion, with Bursa BB

References

External links
 
 Ivana Miloš Prokopić at Volleybox.net
 Ivana Miloš Prokopić at WorldofVolley

1986 births
Living people
Croatian women's volleyball players
Middle blockers
Croatian expatriate volleyball players
Croatian expatriate sportspeople in Azerbaijan
Croatian expatriate sportspeople in Italy
Sportspeople from Rijeka
Croatian expatriate sportspeople in Turkey
Nilüfer Belediyespor volleyballers
Bursa Büyükşehir Belediyespor athletes
Expatriate volleyball players in Azerbaijan
Expatriate volleyball players in Italy
Expatriate volleyball players in Turkey
Mediterranean Games medalists in volleyball
Mediterranean Games bronze medalists for Croatia
Competitors at the 2009 Mediterranean Games